Eastman Mountain is a mountain at the southern end of the Baldface-Royce Range, located in Carroll County, New Hampshire. It is accessed by the Eastman Mountain Trail. Its summit is partially open and provides good views.

References

Mountains of New Hampshire
Mountains of Carroll County, New Hampshire